Carros de Foc is a street theater company with its headquarters in Alicante (Spain). Their unique traits in the shows are the Giant Mobile Sculptures that are combined with different artistic disciplines in order to create surprising shows.
The Company has represented Spain in different Street Theater Festivals around Europe and Africa.

History 

Founded by Miguel Ángel Martín Bordera, son of “falleros” of long tradition and renowned prestige, Carros de Foc has evolved from a street animation group towards a new urban theater concept away from the conventional.
It is a Spanish Urban Theatre company whose philosophy in their works is to transport the audience into magic and fantastic atmospheres. They try to turn every urban space or event where they participate into a unique experience for the audience through a refined work with lighting effects, image and sounds. There is where The Giant Mobile Sculptures become important and join the other artistic disciplines, such as air acrobatics, rope choreographies or fire fans.

Artistic Concept 

Their shows combine different artistic disciplines such as air acrobatics, dance, hoop acrobatics, theater performance with the Giant Mobile Sculptures to create unique and unbelievable atmospheres. 
The Giant Mobile Sculptures are big seized original creations which seem to come to life; they are jointed and provided with mobility, reaching 12 meters tall.
Their realistic looks make them surprising and they represent animals or fantastic characters. The scenic design where the company structures their performances is both own designed and produced and is at exhibition's service in order to create a complete visual experience. 
The character's portrayal, the costumes and the body make up, which have latex details, are all combined to join the different artistic disciplines and be the core of their exhibitions, composing a nonpareil and creative force product.

Shows

Large Format 
Natural Spirit. Salvador
La Leyenda de los Pueblos Olvidados
Dimonis
Copernicus
Lauca de la Fira

Medium Format 
Salvador, La Marioneta Gigante
Águila Sophia
Can Can Express
El Druida de Jagul
La Leyenda de los Pueblos Olvidados
Natural Spirit (MF)
Dimonis

Itinerant 

Adramelech
Piratas
Toro Viriato
Ángel y Caballo Real
Caballo Real in the forest
Nemoris
Una Tribu en tu ciudad
Espejismo
Euterpe 
Ocean Show
Noche Mágica
Universo
Árbol Viviente
El Santo Grial
La Leyenda de los Pueblos Olvidados
Dimonis
Can Can Express
El Druida de Jagul
Mirage
La Mangrana
Paris Parade. Chile

A la carte Show 
San Jorge Cáceres 2011
San Juan y San Pedro en Segovia
Carnaval Romans
Ciudad Deportiva Alaquas
La Crida 2014 Fallas Valencia
Fantasy in Katara
Salvador in Segovia
Salvador en Qingdao
Salvador en Shanghai
King Salvador in Changsha
Monegros Desert Festival
Three Kings Parade 2014. Madrid
The Magic Box of letters

References 
Chariots Of Fire is a company which due to its popularity attracts the interest of television stations and other forms of media wherever they are putting on a show.

Chile 
 MEGAvision. Carros de Foc en FITAN
 Druida de Jagul en festival Arc 2013, Ovalle, Chile
 Paris Parade con Carros de Foc. TVN 24 HORAS TARDE
 Puranoticia. Carros de foc en Paris Parade
 Soychile. Carros de Foc en Paris Parade

Romania 
 Diario ALBA24. Águila Sophia en Alba Iulia.
 Diario ALBA24. Espectáculo Tabarka en Alba Iulia
 Video ALBA24. Carros de Foc en Alba Iulia
 Diario Unirea. Carros de Foc en Alba Iulia.

Morocco 
 TV2 Marruecos. Caros de Foc en Mawazine

Qatar 
Carros de Foc en la TV de Qatar.

Italy
 Report by italian television Pavia TV.

Portugal 
Carros de Foc en Portugal.

Korea 
Natural Spirit en Suwon. South Korea.

Spain 
 Television appearances by Carros de Foc.
 Los gigantes de Carros de Foc llegan a Qatar
 De San Vicente a Shanghai 
 Empresas alicantinas en Shanghai
 IBIZA. Circo, Danza y esculturas móviles para dar vida a la Fira Medieval
 SEGOVIA. El Adelantado. Las Ferias y Fiestas arrancan con fuego 
 SEGOVIA. El Norte de Castilla. Ciencia ficción junto al Acueducto
 SEGOVIA. Zoquejo.com. El 'Amor de tierra y fuego' de Carros de Foc da inicio a lasFiestas de Segovia
 SEGOVIA. Segoviaudaz.es. ¡Viva San Juan y San Pedro!
 SEGOVIA. Segovia.es. Programa de actuación de carros de Foc 
 SAN SEBASTIAN. Dragones, temores y carcajadas  . 
 CAMPAÑA DE REYES. TV1
 Noticia TV1 con Carros de Foc en Reyes Magos 
 "En clau económica" de CANAL NOU con Carros de Foc
 Canal 9. Reyes Magos 
 Carros de Foc en Antena 3. Reyes agos  
 La 6 TV con Carros de Focc Miguel Ángel Martín 
 TV1 España. Noticia en directo desde Carros de Foc 
 Canal 9. Programa en Conexión desde Carros de Foc
 Carros de Foc abre con Salvador la muestra en Feria Valencia 
 Carros de Foc en el programa de TV Vidas anónimas 
 Carros de Foc estrena Demonis en Alicante 
 Reportaje El País .
 Reportaje del canal de televisión marroquí 2M TV
 Los principales canales se hacen eco de Carros de Foc
 Aparición en Noticias Cuatro con motivo del Festival de San Sebastián
 Reportaje del programa "Vidas Anónimas" de La Sexta.
 En TVE1 con motivo de la Cabalgata de Reyes Magos.
 Noticia en Pavia Tv (Italia).
 Noticia en el Periódico de Extremadura con motivo de la representación del espectáculo de San Jorge 2011.
 Carros de Foc triunfa en el Carnaval de Niza.
 Noticia en el Diario Hoy con motivo de la representación del espectáculo de San Jorge 2011.
 Noticia en el Diario de Ibiza con motivo de la actuación en la XII edición de la Fira Eivissa Medieval.
 Natural Spirit Show in Ibiza
 Noticia en el Diario de Ibiza sobre la representación inaugural de la Fira Medieval 2011.
 Crónica en el diario Última hora de Ibiza sobre la representación con motivo de la Fira Medieval.
 Carros de Foc presenta la marioneta más grande de España.
 La Sexta Noticias con Carros de Foc.
 Carros de Foc en Antena 3 Noticias Mediodia.
 Carros de Foc en Directo en Antena 3 Noticias.
 TV1 Noticias Carros de Foc en La Crida en TV1.
Radio San Vicente 95.2FM: Confidencias con San vicente Plaza.
FARO Melilla 06.07.2014
melillamedia.es: Los melillenses acuden en masa al XI Mercado Medieval.
 AlicantiTV: Espectáculo de Carros de Foc en el Mercado Medieval Alicante 2014
 Carros de Foc en INFORMACION TV. Mercado Medival Alicante
ABC.es: La Feria Medieval de Alicante espera atraer a 400.000 visitantes
Información al ciudadano. Ayuntamiento de Alicante 06.06.2014.
alicanteactualidad.com 06.06.2014
 Carros de Foc de Gira en Corea y Emiratos Árabes. INFORMACION TV.
Diario INFORMACIÓN: El Ayuntamiento de Alicante y Carros de Foc celebran el 9 de Octubre .
Diario ABC: El 9 d´Octubre inunda Alicante de figuras gigantes en un desfile histórico.
La VERDAD: Carros de Foc lleva dos montajes al 9 d´Octubre.
Información al ciudadan, Ayuntamiento de Alicante. 6.10.2014.
Alicante City&Experience 7.10.2014.
 Entrevista a Miguel Ángel Martin, creador de Carros de Foc.
 De la Cabalgata a Shanghai.
  El verano más asiático de Carros de Foc. 
 Carros de Foc abre la feria de San Vicente.
 Noticia con motivo de la clausura de la Feria Medieval de Concetaina.
La espectacularidad de Carros de Foc da la salida a la Muestra de San Vicente. 
 El Consistorio busca convertir el Carnaval en atracción turística con un original desfile. 
 El Carnaval recupera el desfile de charangas cinco años después.
  Carros de Foc toma el Carnaval con espectáculos inéditos en Alicante.
 Gran Desfile de Carnaval de Alicante 2015.
 Carnaval espectacular.
La crítica hace grande el Carnaval. 
Magia de altos vuelos.
Un espectáculo de altura.
Acrobacias, marionetas y acordes.
Miradas puestas en el cielo.
 (Vídeo) El espectáculo de Carros de Foc en los premios "Importantes".
 (Fotos) El espectáculo de Carros de Foc en los premios "Importantes".
 Treinta años de respaldo a los "Importantes" de Información

External links 
 Carros de Foc official site.
 Photo Gallery at Flickr.
 Official Youtube Channel.
 Official Vimeo Channel
 Facebook
 Twitter
 Instagram
 Pinterest
 Blog.

Street theatre
Theatre companies in Spain